Step by Step may refer to:

Film and television 
 Step by Step (1946 film), an American film directed by Phil Rosen
 Step by Step (2002 film), a Belgian film directed by Philippe Blasband
 Step by Step (TV series), a 1990s American sitcom

Television episodes 
 "Step by Step" (Cyberchase)
 "Step by Step" (Heartland)
 "Step by Step" (Holmes on Homes)

Music

Albums 
 Step by Step (Chisato Moritaka album), 1994
 Step by Step (Eddie Rabbitt album) or the title song (see below), 1981
 Step by Step (Linda George album), 1975
 Step by Step (New Kids on the Block album) or the title song (see below), 1990
 Step by Step: The Greatest Hits or the title song, by Wet Wet Wet, 2013
 Step by Step, by Peter Tork and Shoe Suede Blues, 2013
 Step by Step, by Stephanie Cheng, 2004
 Step by Step, by Tommy Smith, 1988

Songs 
 "Step by Step" (Annie Lennox song), 1992; covered by Whitney Houston, 1997
 "Step by Step" (Ayumi Hamasaki song), 2015
 "Step by Step" (Eddie Rabbitt song), 1981
 "Step by Step" (New Kids on the Block song), 1990
 "Step by Step", by the Alan Parsons Project from Eye in the Sky, 1982
 "Step by Step", by Braxe + Falcon from their Step by Step EP, 2022
 "Step by Step", by the Crests, 1960
 "Step by Step", by Joe Simon from The Power of Joe Simon, 1973
 "Step by Step", by Peter Griffin, 1980
 "Step by Step", by Rich Mullins from The World as Best as I Remember It, 1991
 "Step by Step", by Sia, 2018
 "Step by Step", by Silver Pozzoli, 1985
 "Step by Step", by Slushii from Out of Light, 2017
 "Step by Step", a theme song from the anime Case Closed, 1996

Other uses 
 Strowger switch or step-by-step, an early electromechanical telephone switching system
 Step by Step, a 1989 exhibition and book of photography by Sirkka-Liisa Konttinen